Ghazaviyeh or Ghazzawiyeh or Qazaviyeh may refer to:
 Ghazaviyeh-ye Bozorg
 Ghazaviyeh-ye Kuchek